GloVe, coined from Global Vectors, is a model for distributed word representation. The model is an unsupervised learning algorithm for obtaining vector representations for words. This is achieved by mapping words into a meaningful space where the distance between words is related to semantic similarity. Training is performed on aggregated global word-word co-occurrence statistics from a corpus, and the resulting representations showcase interesting linear substructures of the word vector space. It is developed as an open-source project at Stanford and was launched in 2014. As log-bilinear regression model for unsupervised learning of word representations, it combines the features of two model families, namely the global matrix factorization and local context window methods.

Applications 
GloVe can be used to find relations between words like synonyms, company-product relations, zip codes and cities, etc. However, the unsupervised learning algorithm is not effective in identifying homographs, i.e., words with the same spelling and different meanings. This is as the unsupervised learning algorithm calculates a single set of vectors for words with the same morphological structure. The algorithm is also used by the SpaCy library to build semantic word embedding features, while computing the top list words that match with distance measures such as cosine similarity and Euclidean distance approach. GloVe was also used as the word representation framework for the online and offline systems designed to detect psychological distress in patient interviews.

See also 
 ELMo
 BERT
 Word2vec
 fastText
 Natural language processing

References

External links
 GloVe
Deeplearning4j GloVe 

Computational linguistics